The Mercator K55K is a type of pocketknife produced in Germany since around 1867.  Mercator knives were primarily produced by Hy. Kauffmann, which was operational from 1856 to 1995. The Mercator K55K knife is still produced in Germany by Mercator, now a division of Otter-Messer.

Construction
The Mercator K55K is of very simple construction: The handle consists of a folded piece of sheet metal, usually painted black, engraved with the outline of a leaping cat and the legend "K55K", with the second "K" being backwards.  The blade has a nail-nick by which it may be grasped to pull it open, and it locks in the open position (a lockback knife), after which it may only be closed by depressing a lever at the back of the knife. As of 2013, the knife can be purchased with a stainless steel or carbon steel blade.

The Mercator's construction is similar to that of the later appeared French Douk-Douk knife, in terms of the simple folded-metal handle. However, the Douk-Douk is a slipjoint knife, whereas the K55K is a lockback knife and has a different blade geometry.

The designation "K55K" with the inversed second K is a code for the original producer's main office in Solingen and the knife model designation. The correct code deciphering according to the website of the current manufacturer would be: "K" for "Kaufmann" (the name of the original producer), "55" for "Hochstraße 55" (the address of the original company residence in Solingen, Germany), and the inversed second "K" (for "Katze" which translates to "cat" - the knife's main emblem).

History

This knife gained popularity in the United States following World War II, as returning servicemen brought Mercator knives home from Germany.  Though some believe that the Mercator K55K was issued to German troops, no evidence of this exists.  However, it is probable that many German soldiers privately purchased these knives for their own use.

The Mercator knife also found some popularity with delinquent youths, and by the mid-1960s the "K55K" or "K55" was described as the "weapon of choice among the older teenagers of the South Bronx."

External links
Official site

References

Products introduced in 1867
Goods manufactured in Germany
Pocket knives